David Kabua (born May 26, 1951) is a Marshallese politician who has served as President of the Marshall Islands since 13 January 2020. He has represented Wotho Atoll in the Legislature of the Marshall Islands since 2008 and served terms as Minister of Health and Internal Affairs.

Early life
Kabua was born in Majuro in 1951 as the fourth child and second son of the first President of the Marshall Islands, Amata Kabua, and his wife, former First Lady Emlain Kabua. He was educated in Xavier High School in Chuuk State, Federated States of Micronesia where he graduated in 1971 and later studied at the University of Hawaii. Kabua subsequently worked as teacher aid, student liaison officer and general manager of the Marshall Islands Development Authority. He was the consul general of the Marshall Islands in Orange County, California, United States, for four years. He also worked as a private business owner for a decade.

Political career
In the 2007 Marshallese general election Kabua was elected to the Legislature of the Marshall Islands for Wotho Atoll for the first time. He was re-elected in the 2011 Marshallese general election. During his second term he served as Minister of Health from 2012 and 2013 and in 2014 he was made Minister of Internal Affairs in a cabinet reshuffle. He was once again elected in the 2015 Marshallese general election. He was Minister in Assistance to the President of Marshall Islands in the cabinet of Casten Nemra in January 2016.

During the 2019 Marshallese general election he was re-elected for Wotho Atoll with 120 votes. On 6 January 2020 Kabua was elected President of the Marshall Islands by the national legislature by a vote of 20–12 with one abstention. He succeeded Hilda Heine, who was seeking a second term, but lost in the first session vote. Kabua said that combating climate change, negotiating with the US regarding the extension of a funding arrangement that expires in 2024 and addressing the issue of Runit Dome as the top priorities of his presidency. Meaghan Tobin, writing for the South China Morning Post described Kabua as a moderate politician who would continue the country's relationship with Taiwan.

In September 2020, in the lead up to the 75th General Assembly of the United Nations Kabua wrote a public letter to The Guardian in which warned about the risks of climate change to his country, stating that his country could disappear.

Cabinet
Kabua and his cabinet were sworn into office by Chief Justice Carl Ingram of the High Court of the Marshall Islands on 13 January 2020.

Personal life
Kabua is married to Ginger Kabua, together they have three children.

References

1951 births
Living people
Children of national leaders
Health ministers of the Marshall Islands
Interior ministers of the Marshall Islands
Marshallese diplomats
Members of the Legislature of the Marshall Islands
Ministers in Assistance to the President of Marshall Islands
People from Majuro
Presidents of the Marshall Islands
21st-century Marshallese politicians